Piney Creek may refer to the following places in the United States:

 Piney Creek (Kings River tributary), a stream in Arkansas
 Piney Creek (Illinois); see Piney Creek Ravine State Natural Area, Illinois
 Piney Creek Site, a prehistoric rock art site
 Piney Creek (Monocacy River), Maryland; see List of rivers of Maryland
 Piney Creek (St. Francis River), a stream in Missouri
 Piney Creek Wilderness, Missouri, a wilderness area named after the creek which runs the length of it
 Piney Creek Township, Alleghany County, North Carolina
 Piney Creek, North Carolina, an unincorporated community
 Piney Creek (Pennsylvania), a tributary of the Clarion River; see List of tributaries of the Allegheny River
 Piney River (Beech River tributary), a stream in Tennessee
 Piney River (East Tennessee), also known as Piney Creek in its upper reaches
 Piney Creek Falls, Tennessee
 Piney Creek (Neches River), Texas

See also
 Big Piney Creek, Arkansas
 Big Piney Creek, namesake of the town of Big Piney, Wyoming